Hygrocybe saltirivula (originally spelled saltorivula) is a mushroom of the waxcap genus Hygrocybe. Described by mycologist Anthony M. Young in 2000, it is found in Australia, where it grows in deep moss in eucalypt woodland.

See also
List of Hygrocybe species

References

External links

Fungi of Australia
saltirivula
Fungi described in 2000